Stephanie J. Murphy is an American veterinary scientist. She is the director of the Division of Comparative Medicine (DCM) in the Office of Research Infrastructure Programs at the National Institutes of Health. Murphy was previously a faculty member at the Oregon Health & Science University.

Education 
Murphy received her V.M.D. and Ph.D. from the University of Pennsylvania. She completed a postdoctoral fellowship in the department of comparative medicine at Johns Hopkins University and is a diplomate of the American College of Laboratory Animal Medicine.

Career 
Murphy joined the department of anesthesiology & critical care medicine at Johns Hopkins as an assistant professor. In 2003, she joined the research faculty at Oregon Health & Science University (OHSU) as a professor of anesthesiology & perioperative medicine. In 2014, Murphy was named director, Division of Comparative Medicine (DCM) in the Office of Research Infrastructure Programs. In DCM, she oversees the human tissue and organ research resource and is the primary contact for R24 applications. Her expertise includes neuroscience and comparative medicine.

Murphy has published articles, reviews and book chapters related to her research and clinical interests. She has secured NIH and other funding for the past 17 years to support her research on sex differences and sex steroids in stroke.

Selected publications

References 

20th-century American women scientists
21st-century American women scientists
20th-century American biologists
21st-century American biologists
American women biologists
National Institutes of Health people
Women veterinary scientists
American veterinarians
University of Pennsylvania alumni
Oregon Health & Science University faculty
Johns Hopkins University faculty
Year of birth missing (living people)
Living people
American women academics